Marius Predatu (born 15 August 1967) is a Romanian former footballer who played as a striker.

International career
Marius Predatu played one game at international level for Romania, being used by coach Cornel Dinu to replace Gheorghe Ceaușilă in the 64th minute of a 2–1 victory against Cyprus at the 1994 World Cup qualifiers.

References

External links

1967 births
Living people
Romanian footballers
Romania international footballers
Association football forwards
Liga I players
Super League Greece players
FC Inter Sibiu players
FC Argeș Pitești players
FC Universitatea Cluj players
ACF Gloria Bistrița players
Panionios F.C. players
Romanian expatriate footballers
Expatriate footballers in Greece
Expatriate sportspeople in Greece
Romanian expatriates in Greece
Romanian expatriate sportspeople in Greece
Sportspeople from Sibiu